Shillong Law College is an undergraduate law college affiliated to the North Eastern Hill University. The college is situated in Malki, Shillong, in the State of Meghalaya. This college has gained the approval of Bar Council of India (BCI), New Delhi. It offers three years undergraduate course (LL.B. or Bachelor of Law) in legal education and five year B.A.LL.B integrated (Hons) course.

History
Shillong Law College was established in 1964, even before the State was created.

References

Universities and colleges in Meghalaya
Colleges affiliated to North-Eastern Hill University
Educational institutions established in 1964
1964 establishments in Assam